Garudinistis is a genus of moths in the family Erebidae erected by George Hampson in 1900.

Species
 Garudinistis eburneana Walker, 1863

Formerly placed here
 Garudinistis variegata Rothschild, 1912

References

Cisthenina
Moth genera